Hoegi-dong is a dong, neighbourhood of Dongdaemun-gu in Seoul, South Korea.

See also 
Administrative divisions of South Korea

References

External links
Dongdaemun-gu map

Neighbourhoods of Dongdaemun District